The 2005 Bahrain Grand Prix (officially the 2005 Formula 1 Gulf Air Bahrain Grand Prix) was a Formula One motor race held on 3 April 2005 at the Bahrain International Circuit in Sakhir, Bahrain. The 57-lap race was the third round of the 2005 Formula One season and the second running of the Bahrain Grand Prix, since its inception the year before.

The race was won by polesitter and championship leader Fernando Alonso for the Renault team. Jarno Trulli finished in second place in a Toyota car and Kimi Räikkönen completed the podium in third position for McLaren.

Friday drivers 
The bottom 6 teams in the 2004 Constructors' Championship were entitled to run a third car in free practice on Friday. These drivers drove on Friday but did not compete in qualifying or the race.

Report

Background
The race was only the second Formula One grand prix held in the Middle East, bringing the challenges of high temperatures and dusty conditions. The race was held the day after Pope John Paul II died, with several teams and drivers offering their respects, most notably Ferrari, who raced with blackened nose cones as a mark of respect. The celebrations on the podium were also muted.

The circuit had been modified slightly from 2004, with turn 4 in particular being widened on the exit.

Before the race, McLaren driver Juan Pablo Montoya injured his shoulder.

Qualifying
First qualifying on Saturday resulted in few surprises– for the first few drivers, the circuit was still somewhat sandy, providing poor grip, while the later runners performed well, with Fernando Alonso taking provisional pole with a lap time of 1:29.848.

Final qualifying on Sunday morning again passed without major incident, with Alonso taking pole position, and Michael Schumacher taking second, driving the brand-new F2005 car. Rubens Barrichello, having had gearbox problems on Friday and Saturday, qualified 15th, and elected to change his engine, resulting in him starting from the back of the grid.

Race
This surpassed the record temperatures of the 1955 Argentine Grand Prix and the 1984 Dallas Grand Prix. Christian Klien failed to get away from his seventh position on the grid for the formation lap. His car was pushed into the pits but could not be restarted, and he became the first of eight retirements.

The leaders made a clean start, with Alonso first to turn one. Schumacher moved from his second grid slot across to the clean side of the track, ahead of Jarno Trulli, who made a strong challenge to pass Schumacher in the first two corners, without success. Barrichello made an aggressive start, moving up to tenth by the end of lap one.

Giancarlo Fisichella's engine began to smoke during lap two, and he pulled into the pits to retire. However, as he applied the pit lane speed limiter, he felt power return, and was waved through by his team. But the resurgence was short-lived, and he was back in the pits on lap four to retire. On lap three, Narain Karthikeyan's car suffered an electrical failure that looked similar to Christian Klien's.

Schumacher continued to closely pursue Alonso until lap 12, when the world champion overshot turn nine, and performed a 270° turn in the run-off area. At the end of the lap, Schumacher coasted back to the pits, making this his first mechanical retirement since the 2001 German Grand Prix– a remarkable run of 58 consecutive grands prix. It later emerged that the car's hydraulics had failed, meaning he could not downshift to use engine braking for corners. Therefore, Trulli now took second place, 2.7 seconds behind Alonso, with Mark Webber in third.

On lap 18, Ralf Schumacher in fourth place made the first scheduled pit stop of the front-runners, and rejoined in 12th place. Alonso, Trulli and then Webber all pitted over the next few laps, in what appeared to be the now fairly standard three-stop pattern. After the pit stops, Alonso retained the lead, followed by Trulli, Webber, Kimi Räikkönen, Ralf, and Barrichello.

Nick Heidfeld was the next retirement, with a blown engine on lap 25, although it took him around half a lap to pull off the track to stop. He was shortly followed by Takuma Sato, whose front brakes had been smoking for a while, and who spun and then retired in the pits on lap 27.  His teammate Jenson Button's brakes also appeared to be giving off more dust than usual, as Button fought to keep Pedro de la Rosa from taking his seventh place. De la Rosa was making his first start for McLaren, replacing the sidelined Juan Pablo Montoya. De la Rosa finally managed to pass Button on lap 33, outbraking him at turn one.

The following lap, Webber lost control out of turn eight, spun on the entrance to turn nine, and allowed Räikkönen and Ralf Schumacher to pass– on a circuit with very forgiving run-off areas, the spin upset the balance of Webber's car and flat-spotted his tyres.

In the next few laps, before the second pit stops, the closest fight was between Barrichello in sixth, and de la Rosa in seventh. De la Rosa continually pressured the remaining Ferrari, but initially he only succeeded in pushing himself too far, running wide at turn one, and allowing Button to close up behind him. Eventually, though, he was able to take sixth place in the final corner.

Alonso put in several fast laps to extend his lead, and pitted on lap 41. The other drivers also pitted without incident, except Button, who stalled his BAR-Honda. After several attempts at restarting the engine, he almost took his rear jack with him back into the race– only to retire at the end of the pit-lane due to a clutch failure, making this the second race in a row where both BAR drivers had retired. After the second round of pit stops, Alonso still led the race, followed by Trulli, Räikkönen, Ralf Schumacher, Webber, de la Rosa, Barrichello, and Felipe Massa.

In the closing stages, the main fight was between Webber and de la Rosa for fifth place. Webber defended strongly, but de la Rosa eventually overcame him two laps from the end of the race. Jacques Villeneuve retired from ninth place into the pits on the penultimate lap, while Barrichello slipped further and further back, allowing Massa to take seventh place and score points in his Sauber team's 200th Grand Prix, and David Coulthard took eighth place on the last lap, making Ferrari scoreless for the first time since the 2003 Brazilian Grand Prix.

Alonso won the race by a comfortable 13.4 seconds from Trulli, bringing Renault engines their 100th World Championship Grand Prix win.

Classification

Qualifying

Notes
  – Rubens Barrichello, Christijan Albers and Patrick Friesacher received a 10-place grid penalty for engine changes.

Race

Championship standings after the race

Drivers' Championship standings

Constructors' Championship standings

Note: Only the top five positions are included for both sets of standings.

References

Bahrain Grand Prix
Bahrain Grand Prix
Grand Prix
Bahrain Grand Prix